Darlington is an unincorporated community in Muskingum County, in the U.S. state of Ohio.

History
The post office at Darlington was called Newton. The Newton post office was established in 1834, and remained in operation until 1897.

References

Unincorporated communities in Muskingum County, Ohio
1834 establishments in Ohio
Populated places established in 1834
Unincorporated communities in Ohio